Zhu Shanlu (born November 1953) is a Chinese politician who served as the Communist Party Secretary of Peking University from 2011 to 2016. He previously served as Party Secretary of the city of Nanjing.

Zhu was born in Jin County, Liaoning province, near the modern city of Jinzhou. He graduated with a degree in philosophy from Peking University. He joined the Communist Party in 1978 and was involved with the Communist Youth League and Communist Party organization on the Beida campus. In April 1998 he was named party chief of Haidian District, where Beida is located; he served until May 2002, when he was made a member of the Party Standing Committee of Beijing, which made him an official of sub-provincial rank. In August 2008 he was transferred to Nanjing to become party chief; he served in the position until March 2011.

He was an alternate member of the 18th Central Committee of the Communist Party of China.

In August 2011, Zhu was named party chief of Peking University. The position has the ranking of a provincial vice governor and appointments to the post are vetted by the central party leadership.

References 

1953 births
Living people
Alternate members of the 18th Central Committee of the Chinese Communist Party
Chinese Communist Party politicians from Liaoning
Delegates to the 16th National Congress of the Chinese Communist Party
Delegates to the 17th National Congress of the Chinese Communist Party
Peking University alumni
People's Republic of China politicians from Liaoning
Political office-holders in Jiangsu
Politicians from Jinzhou